The Philippine Science High School - Caraga Region Campus (PSHS-CRC) is the 13th campus of the Philippine Science High School System located at Brgy. Ampayon, Butuan. The school admits and grants scholarships to students who are gifted in science and mathematics. It caters to scholars from Caraga which covers the provinces of Surigao del Norte, Surigao del Sur, Agusan del Norte, and Agusan del Sur. The PSHS-CRC formally opened in June 2014.

History
The family of former Philippine Vice President Teofisto T. Guingona Sr. donated a five-hectare parcel of land to the Philippine Science High School last April 1, 2013. Construction of the school started in January 2014, in time for opening of classes for school year 2014–2015.

Sources

External links
PSHS Caraga Region Campus official website

Philippine Science High School System
Schools in Butuan